Kim Geun-tae (14 February 1947 – 30 December 2011) was a democracy activist and politician of the Republic of Korea.

Life
Kim was born in Bucheon, Gyeonggi-do. He studied in Kyunggi High School and entered Seoul National University and majored economics.  In college, he started demonstrating against the Yushin Regime of President Park Chung-hee and for democracy. He was arrested several times and served several years in prison. After serving a full sentence, Kim was freed.

Although Park Chung-hee was assassinated in 1979, the military dictatorship was succeeded by General Chun Doo-hwan in 1980. After Kim's release from prison, he began protesting against Chun's regime and founded the democracy activist group, Democratic Youth Coalition (민청련, 民靑聯) in 1983. In 1985, he was arrested for profiting North Korea (which was a frequent frame-up to the democracy movement by the military government) and tortured severely for 23 days by Lee Guen An, who was an inspector of the national police. In 1987, he shared the Robert F. Kennedy Human Rights Award with his wife In Jae-keun. The Award is given annually to those whose courageous activism is at the heart of the human rights movement and in the spirit of Robert F. Kennedy's vision and legacy.

He remembered the details of the torture and the identity of torturer, and revealed it during his trial. The government denied it at that time, but it was revealed as the truth after the democracy movement successfully forced the military regime into enacting democratic reforms. Lee Geun An, who tortured Kim, was wanted for the crime after the political situation reversed.

Kim was regarded as one of the most important activists in the democracy movement of the Republic of Korea and he went into politics on the recommendation of Kim Dae-jung in 1995. After Kim Dae-jung was elected the president of the Republic of Korea in 1997, Kim was one of candidates who could succeed Kim Dae-jung's presidency in the ruling party. Because of a low approval rating, he gave up the race for presidency halfway, and supported Roh Moo-hyun, who won the presidential election in 2002.  During Roh's presidency, he was a former leader of the ruling Uri Party (now the Democratic United Party), and he served as Health and Welfare Minister from 2004 to 2006.  He was also member of Parliament of the Republic of Korea from 1996 until 2008.

Although his political career seemed to go well, he suffered from severe PTSD. Because of this, he refused to go to doctors or dentists, which reminded him of being tortured. He was diagnosed with Parkinson's disease in 2006, which was thought to be due to the torture.

His condition got worse in 2010, deteriorating to the extent that he could not attend his daughter's wedding ceremony. He collapsed from a complication of his Parkinson's disease (a blood clot in the brain) in November 2011.  Kim died on 30 December 2011. He was 64. He was buried in Moran Cemetery, Seongnam, where several notable democracy activists were buried.

In popular culture
He was played by actor Park Won-sang in the film National Security (2012).

References

1947 births
2011 deaths
People from Bucheon
Kyunggi High School alumni
Seoul National University alumni
South Korean democracy activists
South Korean prisoners and detainees
Uri Party politicians
Health and Welfare ministers of South Korea
Members of the National Assembly (South Korea)
Neurological disease deaths in South Korea
Deaths from Parkinson's disease
Robert F. Kennedy Human Rights Award laureates